Teuku Sama Indra (24 April 1964 – 7 February 2023) was an Indonesian politician. A member of the Democratic Party, he served as regent of South Aceh from 2013 to 2018.

Indra died in Banda Aceh on 7 February 2023, at the age of 58.

References

1964 births
2023 deaths
Democratic Party (Indonesia) politicians
South Aceh Regency